Proxicharonia palmeri is a species of sea snail, a marine gastropod mollusc in the family Cymatiidae.

References

 Powell A W B, New Zealand Mollusca, William Collins Publishers Ltd, Auckland, New Zealand 1979 

Cymatiidae
Gastropods of New Zealand